Parallel translation  may refer to:

 parallel transport, in mathematics
 parallel text, in translation